The Waterford Unified School District is a K through 12 public school district in Stanislaus County, California, United States.(Waterford, 2006)  As early as 1989 students attending Waterford schools were bussed if they needed to cross State Route 132 to reach school.

Noise issues
Sound levels at the Waterford Junior High  School have been determined to be approximately 64 DbA, primarily due to roadway noise from State Route 132. This sound level is considered generally unacceptable from the standpoint of speech interference, safety and health effects.

Schools In This School District 
Waterford Elementary School-Moon School (K-3)
Lucile Whitehead Middle School (4-6)
Waterford Junior High/Middle School (7-8)
Waterford High School (9-12)

References

External links
 

School districts in Stanislaus County, California